Mike Lipskin is a stride jazz pianist of the pre-bop jazz style who has created his own special mode within the idiom, protege of Willie the Lion Smith, Eubie Blake and Luckey Roberts. He's a piano instructor, record producer and author. He produced the RCA Vintage Series of historic reissues, played piano and organ on Papa John Creach's self-titled album, produced Ryo Kawasaki's Juice album, and produced Gil Evans' Gil Evans Orchestra Plays the Music of Jimi Hendrix. His 1958 photographs and commentary contributed to the 1995 documentary film A Great Day in Harlem. Lipskin performed at the Fats Waller centennial concert at the 22nd San Francisco Jazz Festival. "Mike Lipskin plays stride with  great accuracy - Eubie Blake. "Mike Lipskin performed Carolina Shout in a tribute to his teacher Willie the Lion Smith with outstanding improvisation"  Peter Watrous,  NY Times.  
Lipskin has directed and performed in six Davies Symphony Hall Stride Summits in San Francisco and performed at Carnegie Hall.  He has several recordings both as soloist and with other pre-bop musicians available on CD Baby, and through mikelipskinjazz.com.  He was staff producer for RCA Records, NY from 1964 to 1977.

References

External links
 
 Profile - Archived version of Stridepiano.com (April 20, 2008) on archive.org - as retrieved on May 26, 2022

Living people
American jazz pianists
American male pianists
American record producers
21st-century American pianists
21st-century American male musicians
American male jazz musicians
Year of birth missing (living people)